Wolnica  (formerly German Freiheit) is a village in the administrative district of Gmina Kożuchów, within Nowa Sól County, Lubusz Voivodeship, in western Poland.

References

Wolnica